WWDD-LD, virtual channel 40 (UHF digital channel 49), is a low-powered Daystar owned-and-operated television station serving Baltimore, Maryland, United States that is licensed to Havre de Grace. The station is owned by Daystar.

History
The station was originally W40AZ in Wilmington, Delaware, which broadcast programming from Smile of a Child TV, a digital television channel owned and operated by Trinity Broadcasting Network; because of the presence of full power TBN station WGTW (channel 48), was one of the few TBN
translators not to carry the parent network.

On September 20, 2010, TBN sold the station to Daystar, who re-called the station as WWDD-LD.

Digital channel

References

External links
Daystar

WDD-LD
Low-power television stations in the United States
Daystar (TV network) affiliates